Philip Brennan may refer to:

 Philip Brennan (Dublin hurler) (born 1983)
 Philip Brennan (Clare hurler) (born 1983)
 Philip Brennan (visual effects artist), see Academy Award for Best Visual Effects